Haplogroup L5 is a human mitochondrial DNA (mtDNA) clade. It was previously known as L1e.

Distribution

L5 is a small haplogroup centered in East Africa. The highest frequency is in Mbuti Pygmies from Eastern Central Africa at 15%.
It is present in relatively small frequencies in Tanzania (Sandawe and others), Kenya, Chad, Ethiopia, Sudan, Nubia, Egypt and Saudi Arabia.

Haplogroup L5 has been observed among specimens at the island cemetery in Kulubnarti, Sudan, which date from the Early Christian period (AD 550–800).

Subclades

Tree
This phylogenetic tree of haplogroup L5 subclades is based on the paper by Mannis van Oven and Manfred Kayser Updated comprehensive phylogenetic tree of global human mitochondrial DNA variation and subsequent published research.

 Most Recent Common Ancestor (MRCA) 
L1-6
L2-6
L5
L5a
L5a1
L5a1a
L5a1b
L5a1c
L5a2
L5c
L5c1
L5c2

References

Notes

External links 

General
Ian Logan's Haplogroups L5.
Mannis van Oven's Phylotree

L5